Pitt Street Poetry is a Sydney-based poetry imprint.

Founded by Linsay and John Knight in 2012, Pitt Street Poetry aims to publish poetry of lasting value and has published poetry in hardback, paperback and ebook formats. Their books include reprints of classic modern Australian poetry as well as new works. The Literature Assessment Panel of the Australia Council gave an Australian Publishing Program grants to Pitt Street Poetry in 2013-14.  and in 2014-5

Martin Duwell in his review of Jean Kent's Travelling with the Wrong Phrasebooks (2012) said the new imprint 'sets a standard in Australian poetry publishing'. The books are distributed through online sales from the publisher's website and a variety of quality booksellers throughout Australia and in Paris and London.

List of poets published or scheduled for publication
 Jenny Blackford 
 Eileen Chong
 Tim Cumming
 Luke Davies
 John Foulcher
 Peter Goldsworthy
 Jean Kent
 Lesley Lebkowicz
 Geoff Page
 Ron Pretty
 Melinda Smith 
 Mark Tredinnick
 Chris Wallace-Crabbe
 Jakob Ziguras

See also
Pitt Street Poetry Website
Radio interview with John Knight, founder of Pitt Street Poetry
The Poetry Book Society online publisher profile

Notes

Australian poetry
Book publishing companies of Australia
Small press publishing companies
Publishing companies established in 2012